Alberto Jiménez may refer to:
Alberto Jiménez-Becerril (1960-1998), Spanish politician
Alberto Jiménez (boxer) (born 1969), Mexican boxer
Alberto Jiménez (footballer) (born 1992), Spanish footballer